The Beloved is a 1991 Soviet-era Georgian drama film directed by Mikheil Kalatozishvili. It was entered into the 42nd Berlin International Film Festival.

Cast
 Avtandil Makharadze
 Nineli Chankvetadze
 Larisa Guzeyeva
 Luka Khundadze
 Maya Bagrationi
 Dato Akhobadze (as David Akhobadze)
 Leo Antadze (as Levan Antadze)
 Guram Mgaloblishvili
 Gogi Margvelashvili
 Pridon Guledani

References

External links

1991 films
1991 drama films
1990s Georgian-language films
Films based on works by Prosper Mérimée
Films directed by Mikheil Kalatozishvili
Drama films from Georgia (country)
Kartuli Pilmi films
Soviet-era films from Georgia (country)